Battle of Hamburg may refer to:
Battle of Hamburg (air) (24 July – 30 July 1943), an Allied strategic bombing campaign (codenamed "Operation Gomorrah") in which over 40,000 German civilians were killed
Capture of Hamburg (18 April – 3 May 1945), one of the last European battles of the Second World War. Fought between the British VIII Corps and the German 1st Parachute Army.
The Battle of Hamburg (book), a book by Martin Middlebrook about the air battle